Cannon Falls is a city in Goodhue County, Minnesota, United States. The population was 4,083 at the 2010 census. Located along U.S. Route 52, southeast of the Twin Cities, Cannon Falls is the home of Pachyderm Studio, where many famous musicians have recorded, including Nirvana, which recorded its 1993 album In Utero there.

Cannon Falls is named for the falls along the Cannon River and serves as the western trailhead for the Cannon Valley Trail.

History

The first settler was Edway Stoughton. A Charles Parks settled the land that is now Cannon Falls in July 1854. Cannon Falls village proper was laid out by Richard and William Freeborn and platted in 1855 by county surveyor S. A. Hart.  The village was incorporated March 10, 1857. A post office was established as Cannon River Falls in 1855, and the name was shortened to Cannon Falls in 1889. Cannon Falls was reincorporated as a city in 1905.

An abundance of water power from both the Big and Little Cannon Rivers attracted manufacturers and capital investment. The first flouring mill was built by R. C. Knox & Co., in 1857. Other manufacturers, such as a wool mill, a grist mill, and a mill producing syrup from amber cane, used power generated from the Little Cannon River starting in 1861.

Geography
U.S. Highway 52, State Highways 19 and 20, and County Road 24 are the main routes in the city.

Lake Byllesby, a reservoir of the Cannon River, lies just west of town.

Demographics

2010 census
As of the census of 2010, there were 4,083 people, 1,708 households, and 1,061 families living in the city. The racial makeup of the city was 94.3% White, 2.4% African American, 0.5% Native American, 0.5% Asian, 0.8% from other races, and 1.5% from two or more races. Hispanic or Latino of any race were 2.2% of the population.

There were 1,708 households, of which 31.9% had children under the age of 18 living with them, 48.2% were married couples living together, 10.2% had a female householder with no husband present, 3.7% had a male householder with no wife present, and 37.9% were non-families. Of all households, 32.1% were made up of individuals, and 15% had someone living alone who was 65 years of age or older. The average household size was 2.33 and the average family size was 2.96.

The median age in the city was 40 years. 23.9% of residents were under the age of 18; 7.4% were between the ages of 18 and 24; 25.3% were from 25 to 44; 26.5% were from 45 to 64; and 17% were 65 years of age or older. The gender makeup of the city was 48.3% male and 51.7% female.

2000 census
As of the census of 2000, there were 3,795 people, 1,550 households, and 996 families living in the city. The racial makeup of the city was 98.18% White, 0.18% African American, 0.29% Native American, 0.66% Asian, 0.42% from other races, and 0.26% from two or more races. Hispanic or Latino of any race were 1.08% of the population.

There were 1,550 households, out of which 32.6% had children under the age of 18 living with them, 51.4% were married couples living together, 9.7% had a female householder with no husband present, and 35.7% were non-families. Of all households, 31.2% were made up of individuals, and 14.8% had someone living alone who was 65 years of age or older.  The average household size was 2.40 and the average family size was 3.03.

In the city, the population was spread out, with 26.5% under the age of 18, 7.6% from 18 to 24, 29.2% from 25 to 44, 19.5% from 45 to 64, and 17.2% who were 65 years of age or older.  The median age was 37 years. For every 100 females, there were 94.3 males.  For every 100 females age 18 and over, there were 89.9 males.

The median income for a household in the city was $40,721, and the median income for a family was $53,903. Males had a median income of $37,095 versus $24,906 for females. The per capita income for the city was $20,820.  About 3.5% of families and 5.6% of the population were below the poverty line, including 5.7% of those under age 18 and 8.7% of those age 65 or over.

Government
The city uses a mayor–city administrator governmental system. Matt Montgomery is mayor, and Neil Jensen is the City Administrator. 

The Cannon Falls Library is the city's public library. It is a member of Southeastern Libraries Cooperating, the SE Minnesota library region. The director is Justin Padgett.Library; WebPage; Located at 306 West Mill, Cannon Falls MN 55009; retrieved November 2022 In the late 20th century, the Library occupied Fireman's Hall, an 1888 Italianate limestone building with two arched entrances and four arched windows along the facade.  Fireman's Hall is now the home of the local Historical Society.

Education

The public school district located in Cannon Falls, Minnesota was founded in 1893.  It comprises Cannon Falls High School, Cannon Falls Middle School, and Cannon Falls Elementary School.

High and middle schools
The high school and middle school share a site.  Enrollment in grades 6 through 12 was 750 students as of the 2017/2018 school year.  The principal is Tim Hodges, and the district superintendent is Jeff Sampson.

 Supported sports teams

 Football (M,W)
 Baseball (M)
 Basketball (M,W)
 Cheerleading (W)
 Cross Country (M,W)
 Dance Team (W)
 Drama (M,W)
 Golf (M,W)
 Ice hockey (M,W)
 Soccer (M,W)
 Softball (W)
 Speech (M,W)
 Tennis (W)
 Track (M,W)
 Trap shooting (M,W)
 Volleyball (W)
 Weightlifting (M,W)
 Wrestling (M)

Elementary school
Grades K–5 have an enrollment total of 607 students.  While the High School has the name Bombers as their mascot, the elementary school has adopted the name Trailblazers.  After Bombers was deemed too violent by the school, an elementary-wide contest was held to come up with a new name for the school's mascot; Trailblazers was the winning name.

Private schools
St. Paul's Lutheran School is a Christian pre-school and K–8 school of the Wisconsin Evangelical Lutheran Synod (WELS) in Cannon Falls.

Religion
St. Paul's Lutheran Church is a member of the Wisconsin Evangelical Lutheran Synod (WELS) in Cannon Falls. The Episcopal Church of the Redeemer is listed on the National Register of Historic Places.

Notable people
Colonel William J. Colvill, a hero of the Battle of Gettysburg, is buried in the Cannon Falls Cemetery. Two American presidents have visited the city. The first, Calvin Coolidge, visited in 1928 to dedicate the memorial erected in honor of Colvill. The second, Barack Obama, held a town hall-style discussion at Hannah's Bend Park on August 15, 2011, while campaigning for his second term. American singer-songwriter Caitlyn Smith was born here June 13, 1986.

See also
 Cannon Falls Public Library

References

External links

 Cannon Falls, MN – Official site
 Cannon Falls Area Chamber of Commerce

Buildings and structures in Goodhue County, Minnesota
Cities in Goodhue County, Minnesota
Education in Goodhue County, Minnesota
Populated places established in 1855